Bunaea alcinoe,  the cabbage tree emperor moth, is an African moth species belonging to the family Saturniidae. It was first described by Caspar Stoll in 1780.

Larva
"Ground colour deep velvety black; each somite, from 4th to 12th, bearing eight white/yellow tubercular processes, two subdorsally, two laterally, and four (in two rows) on each side subspiracularly. The 2nd somite bears four black processes, two subdorsally and two laterally. The 3rd somite bears 4 black processes, as in the 2nd, and two small yellow processes on each side, in line with the subspiracular processes on the other somites. Spiracles red; those on the 4th to 11th somites being surrounded by an irregularly shaped red area. Head and legs concolorous with body". (Fawcett).

Food plants
Species of the genera Bauhinia, Croton, Cussonia and Celtis and the species Harpephyllum caffrum and Ekebergia capensis. In the Democratic Republic of the Congo the larvae feed on Sarcocephalus latifolius, Crossopteryx febrifuga and Dacryodes edulis.

Wings
This structure absorbs the echolocation sound of their predators, the bats, and thus helps them to camouflage themselves acoustically.

Name
In Greek mythology Alcinoe was the daughter of Polybus of Corinth. Alcinoe was also the name of a naiad, daughter of Oceanus and Tethys.

References

Distant, W. L. Insecta Transvaaliensia. (Francis Edwards, London  1924)
Kroon, D. M. (1999) Lepidoptera of Southern Africa. Host-plants and Other Associations. A Catalogue. Lepidopterists’ Society of Africa, xi + 160 pp. 
Latham, P. Edible Caterpillars and Their Food Plants in Bas-Congo Province, Democratic Republic of Congo. (Mystole Publications, Canterbury 2003) 
Rougeot, P.-C. (1962). Les Lépidoptères de l’Afrique noire occidentale. Fascicule 4. Attacidés, Saturniidés. IFAN – Dakar, 214 pp.

External links
Bunaea alcinoe images

Saturniinae
Moths of Africa
Moths of Madagascar
Moths described in 1780